KF Flamurtari is a professional football club based in Pristina, Kosovo. The club plays in the Football Superleague of Kosovo, which is the top tier of football in the country.

History
It was founded in 1968 by four friends, brothers Rizah and Ismet Ismaili, and brothers Ibrahim and Fehmi Prapashtica. 

The club's name was appointed by Agim Sedllari.

League Played In
The club plays in the first division of football in Kosovo, Football Superleague of Kosovo.

Competition Performances
Flamurtari were finalists of the Kosovar Cup for the 2006–07 season, losing 3–0 on penalties to Liria in the final held in Pristina. 

From 1992 to 1999, Flamurtari won the Kosovar Cup twice.

Size of Club
It is the second biggest team in Pristina.

Players

Current squad

Historical list of coaches

 Skender Konjuhi ( -   2022)
 Agon Krasniqi ( -  2021)

References

External links
KF Flamurtari at Soccerway

 
1968 establishments in Yugoslavia
Association football clubs established in 1968
Flamurtari Prishtinë
Flamurtari Prishtinë
Sport in Pristina